Ruthin Town Hall is a municipal facility in Market Street, Ruthin, Denbighshire, Wales. It is a Grade II listed building.

History
The building was commissioned to replace the ageing 17th century town hall in the middle of St Peter's Square. After deciding the old town hall was inadequate for their needs, civic leaders chose to procure a new town hall: the site they selected had previously formed part of the Ruthin Castle Estate: the vendor, Frederick West, insisted that the old town hall be demolished and that the site remain vacant in order to create an uninterrupted view of St Peter's Church from his home, Ruthin Castle.

The foundation stone for the "new market hall and stock exchange" was laid by the mayor, Mr. R.G. Ellis, on 27 October 1863. It was designed by J W Poundley and D Walker in the High Victorian Gothic style and built by William Roberts and Joseph Holland of Ruthin; the contractors got into financial difficulty so delaying completion of the building until September 1865. The design involved an asymmetrical frontage with four bays facing Market Street; the left section of three bays featured arched windows on the ground floor and four narrow windows on the first floor; the right end bay feature an arched doorway on the ground floor, a narrow window on the first floor and a tower above. The arched windows and doorway incorporated carvings by the sculptor, Edward Griffith. Internally, the principal rooms were the council chamber, a public hall, the town clerk's office and an armoury for the local rifle volunteers.

The building became the headquarters of Ruthin Rural District Council when it was formed under the Local Government Act 1894. An annexe to the west of the building was used as a market hall and also accommodated the fire brigade until it moved to Park Road in February 1971. The building ceased to be the local seat of government then the enlarged Glyndŵr District was formed in 1974.

A major programme of refurbishment works was completed at a cost of £400,000 in October 1993. Denbighshire Voluntary Services Council was awarded a grant of £100,000 in November 2019 to convert the market hall into a community and business hub. The town hall remains the meeting place of the local Ruthin Town Council and continues to be used as a register office.

Notes

References

Grade II listed buildings in Ruthin
Grade II listed government buildings
City and town halls in Wales
Government buildings completed in 1865